Vinoo Varghese is an American lawyer who has defended high-profile clients in New York State and federal courts around the country. He provides legal commentary in print and on television. He has appeared on programs such as Hardball with Chris Matthews, The Ingraham Angle, Tucker Carlson Tonight, The Situation Room with Wolf Blitzer, and CBS This Morning. A former prosecutor himself, Varghese is an outspoken critic of the nearly unlimited power of prosecutors. On March 21, 2020, the New York Daily News published an op-ed that Varghese wrote blasting Governor Andrew Cuomo's decision not to include criminal defense lawyers as "essential" in Cuomo's COVID-19 shutdown order. The next day, criminal defense lawyers were deemed "essential." On May 29, 2020, Varghese wrote an op-ed about the Manhattan DA engaging in selective prosecution by prosecuting Yasmin Seweid in 2016 for a false criminal report, but not Amy Cooper in the Central Park “Karen” incident. Two weeks after the publication of this op-ed, then District Attorney Cy Vance, ordered her arrest.

Academics 
Varghese graduated from Chaminade High School. He earned his B.A. in Philosophy from New York University (NYU). Three years after graduating from NYU, he enrolled at Brooklyn Law School, where he earned his Juris Doctor (J.D.).

Career 
After his graduating law school in 2000, Varghese began his legal career as a prosecutor with the Brooklyn District Attorney's Office, where he worked in the trial bureaus, investigations, and appeals. His last position there was running a unit called the Assault on Police Officer Program, which prosecuted attempted murders of NYPD officers. Since February 2006, Varghese has been working as a criminal law defense attorney at Varghese & Associates, P.C located on Wall Street.

Varghese has defended multiple high-profile clients. In 2013, Varghese defended Rengan Rajaratnam, the younger brother of Galleon hedge fund king, Raj Rajaratnam, on insider trading charges.

In 2014, Varghese defended New York City Councilman Daniel Halloran who was described by then U.S. Attorney Preet Bharara as the “quarterback” of a scheme to put a Democrat, Malcolm Smith on the Republican ticket for New York City Mayor.[2] Varghese later criticized Bharara for his pretrial comments to The New York Times. During the trial, the New York Times noted that Varghese's cross-examination of an FBI agent led to a mistrial. During the cross, the agent admitted there were multiple recordings of an informant the government hadn't turned over to the defense. This led to multiple mistrial motions, which Southern District Judge Kenneth M. Karas ultimately granted.

From 2009 to 2015, Varghese represented Tomas Olazabal, a construction company owner charged with tax fraud by the Department of Justice's Tax Division. Olazabal was initially convicted at trial due in large part, to prosecutorial misconduct, but Varghese successfully petitioned the trial judge, Brian Cogan of the Eastern District of New York to grant a rare Rule 33 motion for a new trial. The government then appealed the conviction to the United States Court of Appeals for the Second Circuit. There, Varghese successfully beat back the government's appeal. The DOJ Tax Division then retried Olazabal. The second time around, Varghese secured a complete acquittal.

In 2019, Varghese represented Christopher Gooley, a juror on the Chanel Lewis murder retrial in Queens. Lewis, a young black man with a history of mental illness was convicted in a retrial of murdering young Italian American jogger, Karina Vetrano. The case garnered international attention due to the racial optics of the case and Lewis’ mental state. Gooley, shortly after voting guilty spoke with reporters and told them that he was unsure about his verdict and accused the other white jurors of allowing race and other factors to influence their guilty verdict. [6]

On September 30, 2021, Varghese filed an emergency request to the Supreme Court of the United States in response to Mayor Bill DeBlasio enforcing a vaccine mandate on schoolteachers giving them no choice between getting the vaccine or weekly testing. The Supreme Court application garnered the attention of many national news outlets such as CNN, ABC, USA Today, Bloomberg, The Wall Street Journal, The New York Times, Insider, NPR, and The Hill. Justice Sotomayor rejected the emergency request, but the fight continues when on December 9, 2021, Varghese on behalf of the teachers filed a petition for a writ of certiorari.

Media appearances 
Varghese is also a regular legal commentator on multiple news networks. These include CBS News, Fox Business, Fox News, CNN, MSNBC, Court TV, BBC, i24, TRT World, Canadian TV, HLN, and The Today Show Australia. Varghese also guest hosted on Vanity Fair's True Crime series, where he fact checked various financial crime scenes ranging from The Wolf of Wall Street to Billions. Varghese appeared on Inside Edition to comment on the criminal exposure of the photographer who surreptitiously took a picture of Alex Rodriguez on his toilet in his Manhattan high-rise. Varghese was also featured on Nancy Grace's show, Crime Stories, where he commented on the disappearance and murder of Rebecca Hoover. Varghese has also commented on the 2020 Presidential Election on Arabic news network, Sky News Arabia.

In June of 2021, Varghese was the sole sponsor the 77 WABC Manhattan DA debate, with host Dominic Carter, and candidates Alvin Bragg, Eliza Orlins, Tali Farhadian Weinstein, Elizabeth Crotty, Dan Quart, Diana Florence, Lucy Lang, and Tahanie Aboushi. 

Following the debate, Varghese was asked to join Rudy Giuliani on his show to discuss both of their times in the Brooklyn DA’s office, the Derek Chauvin trial, and Giuliani’s law license being suspended due to representing former President Trump. Additionally, Varghese joined the billionaire owner of 77 WABC Radio, John Catsimatidis, on his show, Cats at Night. He was also joined by former New York City Governor George Pataki, and Lidia Curanaj. They discussed prosecutorial abuse and ways that prosecutors can be held accountable for their actions. In partnership with 77 WABC Radio NY, Varghese helped pioneer an educational radio series called Legal Minute with Vinoo Varghese. Legal Minute breaks down legal issues and relevant news topics in 60-seconds or less with the mission to educate and inform listeners about these issues.

Op-Eds 
Varghese writes frequently and has had his op-eds published by a variety of news outlets, including the New York Law Journal, Law.com, the New York Daily News, and the New York Post. Major television outlets like Fox News have also interviewed Varghese about his op-eds. Fox News invited Varghese on to discuss New York Governor Cuomo's failure to designate lawyers as “essential” during the Coronavirus pandemic. On May 29, 2020, he wrote an op-ed about the Manhattan DA engaging in selective prosecution by prosecuting Yasmin Seweid in 2016 for a false criminal report, but not Amy Cooper in the Central Park “Karen” incident. He also blasted the New York State Bar Association (NYSBA) for advocating for forced adult vaccines, if a COVID-19 vaccine were ever developed. In the same op-ed, he criticized NYSBA for not advocating for its members, lawyers in general, when it refused to fight Cuomo's executive order, designating lawyers as non- “essential.” In March of 2021. Varghese wrote an op-ed titled “Don’t Let Cuomo’s #MeToo Moment Distract from his Impeachable Offenses.” He wrote how New Yorkers should be more concerned about Cuomo’s fatal decision to admit COVID-19 positive patients into nursing homes, and less focused on his sexual harassment allegations.

Work in the community 
Varghese served as president of Chaminade High School's Alumni Lawyers Association from September 2017 through August 2019. He has also acted as an alumni mentor to New York University's College of Arts and Science students since 2014 and taught clinical students from Brooklyn Law School and Hofstra School of Law. He has taught trial advocacy at Harvard Law School, Cardozo Law School, and for the New York City Law Department.

References 

Place of birth missing (living people)
Year of birth missing (living people)
Living people
Brooklyn Law School alumni
Criminal defense lawyers
Nationality missing
New York University alumni